Coast earth station, also called the coast earth radio station is – according to article 1.76 of the International Telecommunication Union´s (ITU) ITU Radio Regulations (RR) – defined as «An earth station in the fixed-satellite service or, in some cases, in the maritime mobile-satellite service, located at a specified fixed point on land to provide a feeder link for the maritime mobile-satellite service.»
Each radio station shall be classified by the service in which it operates permanently or temporarily.

Classification
In accordance with ITU Radio Regulations (article 1) this type of radio station might be classified as follows: 
Earth station (article 1.63)
Mobile earth station (article 1.68) of the mobile-satellite service (article 1.25)
Land earth station (article 1.70) of the fixed-satellite service (article 1.21) or mobile-satellite service
Land mobile earth station (article 1.74) of the land mobile-satellite service (article 1.27)
Base earth station (article 1.72) of the fixed-satellite service
Coast earth station
Ship earth station (article 1.78) of the mobile-satellite service
Aeronautical earth station (article 1.82) of the fixed-satellite service / aeronautical mobile-satellite service (article 1.35)
Aircraft earth station (article 1.84) of the aeronautical mobile-satellite service

References

 International Telecommunication Union (ITU)

Radio stations and systems ITU